Eliot Unitarian Chapel (also known as Saint Peter's) is a historic church in Kirkwood, Missouri.

The building was originally constructed for Grace Episcopal Church. It was built in 1859 by architect Robert S. Mitchell in the Gothic Revival style. Patrick McCullough of Kirkwood (formerly Galway, Ireland) worked as stone mason. In 1961, the building was transferred to Eliot Unitarian Chapel, and the Grace Episcopal congregation moved down Argonne Street to another building. The building was added to the National Register of Historic Places in 1982.

References

External links

Grace Episcopal Church website

Gothic Revival church buildings in Missouri
Churches completed in 1859
Churches on the National Register of Historic Places in Missouri
Religious buildings and structures in St. Louis County, Missouri
19th-century Episcopal church buildings
National Register of Historic Places in St. Louis County, Missouri